Tricontinental Chile is a geopolitical concept denoting Chile's unique position with its mainland in South America, Easter Island in Oceania (Polynesia) and the Chilean Antarctic Territory in Antarctica.

Continental Chile

Continental Chile corresponds to the strip of territory along the southwestern coast of South America and its adjacent islands.

Insular Chile

Insular Chile consists of a group of islands of volcanic origin in the South Pacific, far from the continental coast. In the eastern group are the Juan Fernández Islands and the Desventuradas Islands, which are grouped with South America, while Easter Island and the Isla Salas y Gómez geographically belong to Polynesia in Oceania. Easter Island (or Rapa Nui), is the westernmost part of Chile, situated at 27°S and 109°W.

Chilean Antarctica

As a signatory to the Antarctic Treaty System, Chile has accepted the suspension of its claims of sovereignty without renouncing them, as well as the establishment of a conservation zone for scientific development.

See also
 Chilean Sea
 Maritime history of Chile
 Insular Chile
 Islands of Chile
 Chilean Antarctic Territory
 Geography of Chile
 Chilean–Peruvian maritime dispute
 Pedro Edmunds Paoa
 Pacific Islands Forum
 Easter Island
 Mapuche conflict
 Coordinadora Arauco-Malleco
 Wallmapu
 Patagonia
 Admapu
 Araucanía (historic region)
 Exclusive economic zone of Chile

References

Geopolitics
Politics of Chile
Geography of Chile
Irredentism